Případ dr. Kováře is a Czech drama film directed by Milos Makovec. It was released in 1950.

Cast
 Karel Cernoch - Zednícek
 Stanislav Langer - Vrána
 Václav Lohniský - Vása
 Fan Vavrincová - Pokorná

External links
 

1950 films
1950 drama films
1950s Czech-language films
Czechoslovak black-and-white films
Czechoslovak drama films
1950s Czech films